The Church of Saint John the Baptist, commonly known as the Rotunda of Xewkija or Xewkija Rotunda, is a Roman Catholic church in Xewkija, Gozo, Malta.

History
On 27 November 1678, Bishop Miguel Jerónimo de Molina raised Xewkija from a hamlet to the status of a village, and as the first parish of Gozo outside the town. 

The parishioners, traditionally renowned for their craftsmanship and their building abilities in Maltese Limestone, expressed their wish to construct a bigger church. Built in the 20th century on the site of a previous church, the church was designed by the Maltese architect Ġużè Damato. Its calculated weight is 45,000 tons. The dome is supported by 8 large concrete columns covered with stone. The dome is the world's third highest unsupported dome. The interior is decorated with fine sculpture and modern paintings. The floor is of polished Carrara marble. The Rotunda is the largest church in Gozo and one of Gozo's distinctive landmarks.

The plans of Damato were based on the Santa Maria della Salute church of Venezia, but on a larger scale.  The foundation stone of the Rotunda was laid on 4 May 1952. The old church which was rebuilt at least twice, was left in place while the Rotunda was being built around it, allowing the local people to have a place of worship. The church was officially consecrated on 17 June 1978.

The old church was then carefully dismantled and the best sculptures were saved and rebuilt in an adjacent building under the church belfry. It is now known as the Sculpture Museum. This museum accessible within the church, features the best "lacework" in Maltese stone as well as some important items of the old church, including the main altar with the old titular painting. Within the same museum, one can take an elevator to the dome, where one can go around the dome and enjoy spectacular panoramic views of Gozo and the Northern part of Malta.

The Rotunda is dedicated to Saint John the Baptist. The parish celebrates the main feast on the liturgical feast of the nativity of Saint John the Baptist which fall on 24 June, and the external festivities are celebrated on the closest Sunday. A secondary feast is also celebrated on the liturgical feast of the beheading of Saint John the Baptist.

The Rotunda is also the Spiritual Seat for the Sovereign Military Order of Malta known also as the Knights of Malta.

The church building is listed on the National Inventory of the Cultural Property of the Maltese Islands.

References

Religious buildings and structures completed in 1978
Votive offering
Baroque church buildings in Malta
20th-century Roman Catholic church buildings in Malta
Church buildings with domes
Rotundas (architecture)
Rotunda
National Inventory of the Cultural Property of the Maltese Islands